BBC Music Jazz (a British national radio station) was a temporary pop-up Digital Audio Broadcasting (DAB) service which was a collaboration between BBC Radio, Jazz FM and The EFG Jazz London Festival.

The service ran from Thursday, 12 November 2015 until Sunday, 15 November 2015. The BBC Music Jazz event marked the broadcaster's first major collaboration with a commercial rival. BBC Music Jazz was available via Digital Audio Broadcasting, online on the BBC Music Jazz's official website, or via the BBC Radio iPlayer app. The service was unavailable on digital television.

The station returned on Thursday 10 November 2016 at 10am, running round the clock until Monday 14 November at 10am.

Presenters 

 Guy Barker
 Craig Charles
 Don Cheadle
 Jamie Cullum
 Robert Elms
 Leo Green
 Mary Anne Hobbs
 Jools Holland
 Hardeep Singh Kohli
 Stewart Lee
 Claire Martin
 Ana Matronic
 Cerys Matthews
 Helen Mayhew
 Colin Murray
 Laura Mvula
 Michael Parkinson
 Gilles Peterson
 Gregory Porter
 Geoffrey Smith
 Moira Stuart
 Clare Teal
 Steve Wright
 Will Young

See also 
 BBC Radio 2 Country
 BBC Radio 2 Eurovision

References

External links 
 
 Media UK's BBC Radio 2 site including scheduled programming

 
Music Jazz
Radio stations established in 2015
Digital-only radio stations
Adult contemporary radio stations in the United Kingdom
2014 establishments in the United Kingdom
Defunct radio stations in the United Kingdom
2016 disestablishments in the United Kingdom 
Radio stations disestablished in 2016